Yi Jaegwan (1783–1837) was a painter of the late Joseon period. Yi taught himself but excelled at almost all kind of genres in painting such as sansuhwa and inmulhwa.

See also
Korean painting
List of Korean painters
Korean art
Korean culture

External links
Brief biography and gallery (in Korean)

1783 births
1837 deaths
19th-century Korean painters